Vratnica is a small village and community located in the Jegunovce Municipality of North Macedonia. Vratnica lies in the north-west, and is 22 km away from the city of Tetovo and 5 km away from Jažince - the border crossing point with Kosovo. Prior to 2003 Vratnica was the centre of the now disestablished Vratnica municipality.

It is situated in the upper part of the Polog plain, at the foothills of northern part of Šar Mountain, under the Ljuboten peak. The village lies at 700–760 meters above the sea level.

History
The most probable origin of Vratnica's name comes from the word vratnica, which means 'small door, gate' in Macedonian and other Slavic languages. This would suggest that Vratnica was thought of as a gateway (a vrata in Macedonian and Serbian) between Kaçanik and the Polog Valley. Other theories suggest that because of population movements, Vratnica got its name (se vraća/се враќаto 'to return, come back' in Macedonian, vratiti se in Serbian) when the ethnic Macedonian community that migrated back from Kosovo to this part formed a community in the 15th century (assuming that the theory of migration is true). Another theory suggests that Vratnica is some sort of gateway. Another less probable theory suggests that the western side of Ljuboten, a mountain peak above Vratnica, looks like a neck (vrat, shija - Shija Ljubotenska, in Macedonian and Serbian).

The original name of the village of Moravce could be due to the migration of the first inhabitants (mid-10th century), from the Morava River, or the Slavic tribe called the Moravians that settled eastern Serbia from central Europe. When they moved to Shar Mountain they named their village based on the region they migrated from; hence, the Morava area. Due to the Austro-Turkish war of the late 17th century (1689), the inhabitants of the former village of Moravce participated as volunteers in the war against the Turks. As a result, the village was destroyed by Turks and the inhabitants fled north into Kosovo and elsewhere in the Polog Valley. They settled in abandoned Serb homes that were left vacant due to the great migration of 1690. The area settled by Moravcani was mainly in the southeastern part of Kosovo. Due to the exodus, the Turks were quick to realize they had less population to work fields, so they openly called back people to return to their former villages and would not face retribution for partaking in the war against them. As a result, some families originating from Moravce came back to their former village on Shar mountain, and were recognized by surrounding villages as "the returnees" (vratili se). When they began expanding the old village of Moravce from the upper to lower part of Shar Mountain, they became known as Vratnichani or simply the village Vratnica.

Vratnica was mentioned for the first time in Ottoman defters (tax registry and land cadastre) dating back to the 15th century. It was recorded that there were about 59 families living in Vratnica. In the defter labeled 4 for the years 1467/68 the number of houses had increased to 66, while in 1545 there is a record of 76 houses, and in 1568 there were 84 houses registered.

The village underwent migrations and settlement until the 18th century, and in the 20th century, there was extensive chain migration to the United States. In 1914/1916, the total population of Vratnica was 1,131 with 131 houses; in 1948, there were 1,299 inhabitants and 197 houses; in 1953, there were 1,387 inhabitants and 214 houses; in 1961, the respective numbers were 1,384 and 227; in 1968, 1,240 and 225; and, in 1971, 1,082 inhabitants and 266 houses.

The village of Moravce is also important for Vratnica history, as it was located on the northwest, 800 meters above present day Vratnica. Due to the oppression of the Ottoman Turks, Moravce inhabitants were forced to search for better living conditions. They directed their steps to the north, towards Kosovo and middle Serbia, but Vratnicans were forced to leave those regions as well. They eventually came back and formed modern Vratnica with the ones that stayed at the native land.

During the 2001 War between Albanian insurgents and the Macedonian state, Vratnica was besieged by the NLA. In 2005 Albanians opened fire on the local police station.

Language
Vratnichani speak on 'Vratnica' dialect, which is part of the western subgroup of the northern group of dialects of Macedonian. Serbian linguistics refer to it as a sub-dialect of Serbia's southeastern 'Torlak' dialects called 'Prizrenski/Timochki'.  It draws its grammar origin from today's Macedonian, but incorporates both Macedonian, Serbian, and old Slavonic words (Example: rabotam 'to work', golemo 'big', astal 'table', das 'rain', and prajem 'to make').  The accent is related closest to southeastern Serbian ekavica, and when some southern Macedonians hear the speech they refer to it as sounding more like Serbian.  This is due to Vratnica falling in the 'transitional dialectal zone'; where the speech takes characteristics from Macedonian, Bulgarian and southeastern Serbian.  Many archaic words found in the village are also found in Macedonians in today's northern Greek villages (Example: 'furna' = bakery,'sukalo' = rolling pin and 'tache'=like that(oddly only spoken in a few villages in Polog)).  This may be in part because the original Slavic-speakers that settled in northern Greece gradually moved northwards over the centuries bringing their native speech with them.  Vratnica has many archaic words (Old Church Slavonic) that 'may have' originated from northern Greek Macedonia, and spread north into today's North Macedonia, southeastern Kosovo and southeastern Serbia.

Demographics
Vratnica consists of mainly Macedonians and some Serbs.

The South Slavic-speaking community is divided between Macedonian and Serbian ethnic identification, although the majority identify as ethnic Macedonians, as indicated in the most recent censuses. Most of the Vratnicani who consider themselves to be Serbian reside in the United States; however, there are still many Vratnicani in the United States who are Macedonian. Although all practice Orthodox traditions, the Vratnicani who consider themselves as Serbian in the United States identify as members of the Serbian Orthodox Church, while Vratnicani who are Macedonian identify with the Macedonian Orthodox Church.

In 1961, there were 1,384 inhabitants living in Vratnica. However, by 1994 the population had decreased to 572, of which 522 were Macedonians, 33 were Serbs, and 17 others.

According to the Macedonian census 2002, the ethnic groups in the village are:
Macedonians 482
Serbs 20
others 3

Notable people
Notable people of Vratnican descent.
Ane Mihailovich, footballer
Sasho Cirovski, football coach
Slavko Milosavlevski, sociologist
Ed Jovanovski, NHL hockey player

Regular Events
 Traditional Mayday Tournament "VRATNICA" - (May 1). One of the biggest sport events in the Polog region. The tournament includes football and streetball (basketball) competition. In the past handball was also played.

References

External links
 Vratnica.info - Vratnica Fresh News, Articles, Information and Photos
 Vratnica @ Twitter - Latest short news from Vratnica area.
 Vratnica United - Bringing Vratnica People Together - Website dedicated to Vratnica and its people. Info, photos, news, events, lifestyle...
 VratnicaUSA.com - Website for people from Vratnica that live in the United States.

Villages in Jegunovce Municipality
Šar Mountains